Takleh-ye Abbasabad-e Olya (also Romanized as Takleh-ye ‘Abbāsābād-e ‘Olyā; also known as ‘Abbāsābād-e Bozorg and Qeshlāq-e Yel Ātān) is a village in Tazeh Kand Rural District, Tazeh Kand District, Parsabad County, Ardabil Province, Iran. As of the 2006 census, its population was 342, with there being 69 families.

References 

Towns and villages in Parsabad County